Schmiederite is a secondary mineral in the oxidized zone of selenium-bearing hydrothermal base metal deposits. Its chemical formula is Pb2Cu2(Se4+O3)(Se6+O4)(OH)4.

It was first described in 1962 for an occurrence in the Cóndor mine, Los Llantenes district, Sierra de Cacheuta, La Rioja Province, Argentina (type locality). It was named for Oscar Schmieder (1891–1980), German geographer.

References 

Copper minerals
Selenium minerals
Tellurate and selenate minerals
Monoclinic minerals
Minerals in space group 11